PC United is a Montserratian football club based in Brades. P.C. United compete in the Montserrat Championship the highest tier of football on the island. The football club has never won any domestic titles or silverware.

Current Team

References

Football clubs in Montserrat
Brades